Kabuntalan, officially the Municipality of Kabuntalan (Maguindanaon: Inged nu Kabuntalan; Iranun: Inged a Kabuntalan), is a 5th class municipality in the province of Maguindanao del Norte, Philippines. According to the 2020 census, it has a population of 25,439 people.

It is formerly known as Tumbao.

The town was part of the province of Shariff Kabunsuan from October 2006 until its nullification by the Supreme Court in July 2008.

Geography

Barangays

Kabuntalan is politically subdivided into 17 barangays.
 Bagumbayan
 Buterin
 Dadtumog (Dadtumeg)
 Gambar
 Ganta
 Katidtuan
 Langeban
 Liong
 Lower Taviran
 Maitong
 Matilak
 Pagalungan
 Payan
 Pedtad
 Pened
 Poblacion
 Upper Taviran

Climate

Demographics

Economy

See also
List of renamed cities and municipalities in the Philippines

References

External links
 Kabuntalan Profile at the DTI Cities and Municipalities Competitive Index
 [ Philippine Standard Geographic Code]
Philippine Census Information
Local Governance Performance Management System

Municipalities of Maguindanao del Norte
Populated places on the Rio Grande de Mindanao
Establishments by Philippine executive order